War is a fantasy novel by Simon Hawke, set in the world of Birthright, and based on the Dungeons & Dragons role-playing game. It was published in May 1996.

Plot summary
The autochthonous elves, driven back into the forest of Cerilia by the humans, who had in turn been forced out of their ancestral lands by lackeys of the Dark One, now live in uneasy peace with their invaders after centuries of war. The elves fear for the forest as the humans continue to carve out their civilization, but this concern is overshadowed by the matter of an empty throne.

Reception
Jonathan Palmer reviewed War for Arcane magazine, rating it an 8 out of 10 overall. He comments that "Hawke seems to be building himself a soap opera here, one perhaps more like Dallas than anything else. The sequel to The Iron Throne [...] is aptly titled, but the plot of this new series of Birthright books is beginning to focus on what goes on in the bedroom rather than what happens on the battlefield. This writer likes to describe intrigue born of sexual power, blackmail and underhand dealings, and he interprets (probably correctly) civil war as a time for personal vendettas as well as national scores." He continues: "Although this is 'Time of Legends' fantasy, there are a lot of parallels with the politics of the Arizona Indian Reservation where the author lives. Gannd, the son of the elf warrior Sylvanna and Lord Aedan of Anuire, is what humans pejoratively refer to as a 'breed' - half-elf, half-human. His character develops as he travels with the rather two-dimensional Reese. [...] And, if you don't want politics, Simon Hawke is also obviously an American football fan as one scene clearly shows." Palmer concludes his review by saying, "Hawke's world is detailed and convincing. He writes with a languid confidence and the clarity not to confuse you with the intricacy of his plotting. The Iron Throne had an easier wit, but this is a commendable sequel and an inspiring read for anyone involved in a Birthright campaign. You don't need to have read the first book to enjoy War, because much of what has happened before is cleverly re-capped. But I would advise you to do so anyway, not because it has the same cover image, but because it's good and this series could go on for a while."

Reviews
Backstab #9

References

1996 novels
Birthright (campaign setting) novels
Novels by Simon Hawke